Michel Joseph Mulloy (born May 20, 1954) is an American priest of the Catholic Church. He was bishop-elect of the Diocese of Duluth from June 2020 to September 2020 when he resigned his posts and ceased exercising his ministry following an allegation of sexual abuse of a minor. He previously served in the dioceses of Sioux Falls and Rapid City. He was vicar general of the latter from 2017 to 2020.

Early life
Mulloy was born in Mobridge, South Dakota, on May 20, 1954.  He completed his primary education there and studied at Mobridge High School, before moving to Sioux Falls and attending O'Gorman Catholic High School. He went on to study at Saint Mary's University in Winona, Minnesota, obtaining a Bachelor of Arts in classical humanities from that institution.  He subsequently attended seminary at the Saint Paul Seminary in Saint Paul, Minnesota.  On June 8, 1979, Mulloy was ordained to the Catholic priesthood for the Diocese of Sioux Falls.

Presbyteral ministry
Mulloy's first pastoral assignment was as a fidei donum priest (i.e. sent to a mission territory) to the Diocese of Rapid City, where he was assistant parish priest at the Cathedral of Our Lady of Perpetual Help.  He was then transferred to Christ the King Parish (Sioux Falls) as an assistant two years later, before becoming the administrator of St. Joseph's Parish (Faith) in 1983.  He was consequently incardinated in Rapid City on a permanent basis and served in that diocese for over three decades beginning in 1986.  In May 2017, he became vicar general of Rapid City.  As such, he was deputy to the diocesan bishop, Robert D. Gruss, and became diocesan administrator when Gruss was installed as Bishop of Saginaw in July 2019. He served as administrator until the ordination of Peter Michael Muhich as bishop of Rapid City in July 2020.

Episcopal ministry
Mulloy was appointed Bishop of Duluth on June 19, 2020.  His consecration and installation as bishop was scheduled for October 1, 2020. But before he could be ordained Pope Francis accepted his resignation on September 7, 2020. On August 7, the Rapid City Diocese had received an allegation that Mulloy sexually abused a minor in the 1980s. The Diocese informed law enforcement officials and ordered Mulloy to "refrain from engaging in ministry". Mulloy is no longer listed as the Diocese of Rapid City's vicar general.

References

External links
Roman Catholic Diocese of Rapid City Official Site

1954 births
Living people
People from Mobridge, South Dakota
20th-century American Roman Catholic priests
21st-century American Roman Catholic priests